The Fight for Freedom is a 1908 American black-and-white short silent Western film which may have been directed by D. W. Griffith. Filmed in Shadyside, New Jersey in June 1908, the film was released on July 17, 1908.

Plot
The film opens in a town on the Mexican border. A poker game is going on in the local saloon. One of the players cheats and is shot dead by another of the players, a Mexican named Pedro. In the uproar that follows, Pedro is wounded as he escapes from the saloon. The sheriff tracks Pedro to his home but Pedro kills him too. Pedro's wife, Juanita, and his mother hide him so he can recover from his wounds. The posse arrives and Juanita is arrested on suspicion of murdering the sheriff. Pedro rescues her from the town jail and the two head for the Mexican border. Caught by the posse before they reach the border, Juanita is killed and the film ends with Pedro being arrested and taken back to town.

Cast

Leads
 Florence Auer as Juanita
 Arthur V. Johnson as Pedro
 Kate Bruce as Pedro's mother

Supporting
 John G. Adolfi
 Edward Dillon as posse member
 George Gebhardt as man in saloon / guard
 Wallace McCutcheon Jr.
 Anthony O'Sullivan as bartender  
 Robert G. Vignola

Attribution to D. W. Griffith
The film is said to have been directed by Griffith but the American Film Institute does not confirm this and queries it. The Fight for Freedom was released only three days after Griffith's first directorial film, The Adventures of Dollie and only three days before another film attributed to him, The Tavern Keeper's Daughter. While the American Mutoscope and Biograph Company was known for the fast production times of its films, it is possible that Griffith had a role in the production of this one but it was actually directed by someone else.

See also
 D. W. Griffith filmography
 List of American films of 1908

References

External links
 

1908 films
1908 Western (genre) films
American black-and-white films
American silent short films
1900s English-language films
Films directed by D. W. Griffith
Films shot in New Jersey
Silent American Western (genre) films
1900s American films